Tudeshk (also Romanized as Tūdeshk, Toodeshk, and Tudashk; also known as Tūdasht, and Tūdeshg) is a city in Kuhpayeh District, Isfahan County, Isfahan Province, Iran. At the 2006 census, its population was 3,940, in 1,100 families.

References

Populated places in Isfahan County

Cities in Isfahan Province